Follow the Cipher is a heavy metal band from Falun, Sweden, that was formed in 2014 by Sabaton contributor Ken Kängström, who is also the group's lead guitarist. The other members include bassist Jonas Asplind, drummer Karl Löfgren, guitarist and backing vocalist Viktor Carlsson. The band released their self-titled debut album on Nuclear Blast Records in May 2018.

Members 

 Daniel Sjögren - drums (2014, 2019–present)
 Ken Kängström - lead guitar (2014–present)
 Viktor Carlsson - rhythm guitar, backing vocals (2014–present)

Past members 

 Jonas Asplind - bass guitar, backing vocals (2014-2020)
 Viktor Gustavsson - lead vocals (2014)
 Joakim Johansson - rhythm guitar (2014)
 Björn Lundqvist - bass guitar (2014)
 Karl Löfgren - drums (2014-2019)
 Linda Toni Grahn - lead vocals (2014–2021)

Discography 
Studio Albums
 Follow the Cipher (2018, Nuclear Blast)
Singles
 The Pioneer (2019, Nuclear Blast)
 Rewind The Stars (2021, Nuclear Blast)

References

External links 
Official Facebook page

Swedish power metal musical groups
Musical groups established in 2014
2014 establishments in Sweden